Hyloconis luminata is a moth of the family Gracillariidae. It is found in China (Hebei, Shanxi and Beijing).

References

External links

Moths described in 2012
Endemic fauna of China
Lithocolletinae

Insects of China
Taxa named by Hou-Hun Li
Taxa named by Hai-Yan Bai